Highway Thru Hell is a Canadian documentary TV series that follows the operations of Jamie Davis Motor Truck & Auto Ltd., a heavy vehicle rescue and recovery towing company based in Hope, British Columbia. Quiring Towing, Aggressive Towing, MSA Towing, Mission Towing and Reliable Towing are also featured in the series. The show focuses on the hardships of operating along the highways of the BC Interior, especially the Coquihalla Highway (Coq).

Episodes

Production
Highway Thru Hell was created by Mark A. Miller, Kevin Mills, and Neil Thomas. Thomas met one of the heavy rescue operators for Jamie Davis Motor Truck & Auto after Thomas' moving truck broke down on Highway 5 in the summer of 2010. In the early winter of 2011, cameraman Mills and executive producer Miller dropped in on Davis' company while passing through Hope. The idea of a show about heavy recovery was discussed. The winter of 2010–2011 had been a record-setting season for Davis' business, and he expressed a desire to change the public's perceptions about his industry.

In his review of High Arctic Haulers, another reality-TV series produced by Great Pacific Media, Jim Bell of Nunatsiaq News described the formula used by this and similar shows: "Rugged teams of blue-collar heroes, mostly male, struggle against bad weather, bad luck and other hardships to transport the necessities of life ..."

Highway Thru Hell debuted on Canada's Discovery Channel on Tuesday, September 4, 2012. Steep hills, lethal drop-offs, killer rockslides, and the worst weather in a decade captivated audiences, resulting in the most-watched series premiere in the channel's history.

The second season premiered on September 3, 2013, and included 13 new episodes, as well as four re-edited Season 1 episodes featuring new content, factoids, and viewer tweets.

After Season 2, competition in the Hope area became more intense, causing Davis to seek out new territory, and expand his business (and fleet) along Alberta Highway 63. In Season 3, Davis is seen dealing with the stresses of business expansion, especially as senior drivers step into managerial roles in his absence, and sometimes leave chaos in their wake. As an active avalanche season occurs on the Coquihalla, the issue of post-traumatic stress disorder is tackled by the series, as some drivers encounter difficult situations. Al Quiring's family business, Quiring Towing, is featured more prominently in this season.

Filming for Season 4 took place in British Columbia and Alberta during the winter of 2014–2015, when the days-long Hope Ice Storm occurred. Davis' company is split into two "camps", and he sometimes calls in his brother's company, Aggressive Towing, for backup. Mission Towing, a family business including generations of tow-operators, headquartered in British Columbia's Fraser Valley, is first featured in this season.

Season 5 kicked off on September 13, 2016, with an episode depicting a teary-eyed Davis selling his beloved rotator. Quiring Towing tackles some difficult excavator recoveries in British Columbia's nasty peat bog, and Davis' crew suffers some near-misses.

In Season 6, Davis closes his company's Alberta offices, shrinking his operation to Hope and Chilliwack, British Columbia. In an effort to make his business more lean, Davis begins buying and restoring older equipment to add to his fleet, such as a vintage 22-ton Holmes Python wrecker.

Season 7 began airing on September 4, 2018. At Davis' yard in Hope, classic Holmes tow trucks – some nearly half a century old – are replacing newer, costlier wreckers. For Davis, the vintage trucks are more than just a passion; they represent survival. Under pressure to reduce costs and stay competitive, Davis is confident he and his crew can tackle some of the toughest jobs – on and off the Coquihalla – using an older, rebuilt fleet. Colin McLean is back in Hope as lead driver, but since he has driven some top-of-the-line hydraulic trucks, Davis' "old iron" takes some getting used to. The seventh season sees some of the younger generation stepping up, with Cary Quiring one of the first to respond to a
mass-casualty event
on the Coquihalla, and Dylan Greenwood of Mission Towing taking the lead on some big wrecks and recoveries in the Fraser Valley. Reliable Towing, out of Merritt, makes its debut in the second half of Season 7, first responding to a small wreck of a truck and trailer with pigs inside, and then to a six-semitrailer crash on the Coquihalla, north of Merritt.  Mudslides and rockslides contribute to a tough time for recovery crews all around. The season ends with a tearful goodbye as Davis sells HR 117 to Reliable which adds the truck to their Mission fleet.

Season 8 opens with the winter of 2019 and the Hope Mudslide which almost destroys Davis' yard and buries The Coq in 20 feet of mud cutting off access to Merritt and Abbotsford. Davis buys a new Mack Anthem and dubs it HR 127 to close out the season.

Season 9 begins with Davis hiring Greg to drive HR 127 and marks the return of TR 37 to service which was under repairs in Davis' shop at the end of Season 7 to get a new motor. The season ends with the return of Colin and the passing of Ken Monkhouse who died in May 2020. Davis tries to get Colin back by ordering HR 130 but ends up selling HR 126 to pay for the truck. Quiring Towing is profiled as Quiring shows us his hobby of recovering and restoring old bulldozers and excavators and several recoveries featuring Quiring using his dozers to recover wrecks and trapped machinery from the peat bogs following the landslides.

Season 10 opens with Davis buying Columbia Towing out of receivership and acquiring some of his former trucks back which he sold to them at the end of Season 3 when he closed Alberta and opening a new yard in Golden. Davis also gets Brandon back who now works for a flagging crew out of Golden. Mission is forced to bring out all their trucks and even ask for help when a logging truck goes over the edge. Jr. joins the Davis crew as a swamper and Davis announces his projects for the year. The COVID-19 Pandemic forces Davis to lean back his operation as mandates go into effect. The Season ends with Davis teaming up with Aggressive to recover a truck that went over the edge, Davis in Ely, Nevada buying one of his project trucks and a used boom for 47, and Davis in LA buying HR 56 from the LA Fire Department and adding it to his fleet. The Rotator is also profiled recovering two wrecks after its arrival from LA, a lumber truck that went off the road in the same spot another one did in Season 6, a logging truck that went over the edge in Fraser Canyon, and a tanker which almost causes a chemical spill. Davis also reminisces on 10 years of Highway Thru Hell on the air.

Season 11 opens with another mudslide in Hope which threatens to take out Davis' yard, Davis Towing acquires several new trucks some of which appeared on Ice Road Truckers and other shows, The Coq is rebuilt so Davis can help with the cleanup, Davis says goodbye to some of his fleet after HR 127 is lost in a fire and COVID forces him to make selloffs to pay Miller for replacements to keep his fleet running, and an old warhorse returns to the Coq while Jr. profiles his projects with Davis working on some of his own.

International broadcast
 National Geographic Channel began airing the show on its American and Scandinavian channels in spring 2013, and has also aired the first two seasons on its British and Irish channel. 
 The Weather Channel broadcast the show in the United States as well, beginning in October 2013. 
 TV3 screened the first season in New Zealand in 2015. 
 Season 1 was also shown in France on RMC Découverte in 2015.
 Australia's ABC2 screened the first three seasons in 2016.
 ProSieben Maxx has been broadcasting the show in Germany, under the title Highway Heroes Canada, since March 2015.
 In Iran, the show is broadcast on IRIB Mostanad. 
 Seasons 1 through 5 were available in some territories on Netflix by January 2017. By January 2020, the series was no longer available on the platform.

Fleets

Jamie Davis Motor Truck fleet 

Jamie Davis Hope Yard

 HR 56 – 1995 Peterbilt 377 Century 1040 (40 ton rotator)
 HR 63 "Mighty Mo" – Western Star Holmes 850 (40 ton)
 LR 19 – 2019 F550 Chevron 408 (Jr.'s personal truck) 
 TR ? – 1996 KW
 TR 37 – 1974 Peterbilt Tractor
 low bed trailer
 TR 134 – 2022 Freightliner M2 22 ft Centaury 3212 Tandem Wrecker  (replacement for Coastline's TR 43 which was sold)

Golden Yard
 HR 130 - 2020 Peterbilt 389 Holmes Wrecker (30 ton)
 129 – 2017 Chevy 4 door tow truck (1 ton)
 TR 128 - 2016 Volvo
 TR ?? 2005 Freightliner Coronado with Landoll trailer (bought from Central Valley Towing in 2022)
 FD 131 – 2021 Ford F-550 22 ft Century flat deck truck (5 ton)

Coastline Trucks

 46 – 2000 Peterbilt DTU
 48 – 2020 Ford F-550 22 ft century flat deck truck
 49 - 2021 Ford Jerr Dan self loader
 51 – 2016 Freightliner M2 22 ft Century single axle flat deck truck (5 ton)

Out of Service (Project List)
HR??? 1985 Kenworth c500 with 2022  century 9055XL (being built at commercial truck)
 HR??? 1994 peterbilt 379 with 2022 century 5230 (currently being built at commercial truck)
 Coastline 50 – 1985 Western Star Holmes 750 (25 ton, rebuilding, close to completion)
 ? – Holmes 1601 Python (22 ton, rebuilding onto Peterbilt chassis, unknown completion)
 TR 47 – 1979 Holmes 500 (10 ton, awaiting upgrade to Holmes 600, to be renumbered to Coastline 47 its original number) 
 HR 50 – DTU, Bruce "Crazy Horse" Hardy's Former Truck 
 TR 52 – Kenworth Tractor Trailer "007" (blown engine, supposed to be stretched and get a 1701)
 ? – Coastline GM with twin line Holmes 480 unit
 ? – yellow GMC currently tandem axle gas engine
 ? – old Yeller Holmes 750
 ? – 1990 Chevy Silverado with AATAC body (Jr.'s project truck, to be mounted onto a Ford F350 XLT , will be assigned to Hope Fleet)
 ? – 1998 Ford F350 XLT crew cab (new chassis for Jr.'s project truck, see above)

Incident Response

 IR 105
 IR 106
 IR 108 – 4-wheel drive

Jamie's former fleet 
 R 120 – Rescue truck out of service, 
 TR 44 – used for parts, see HR 50 above (Project List)
 MR 60 – Army Truck Holmes 600
 MR 62 – Holmes 600
 MR 64 – Peterbilt (15 Ton)
 HR 66 – Century / International chassis (25 ton), sold to Columbia towing
 HR 70 "The General" – 1980 GMC, Holmes 1801 (45 Ton), sold June 2021 to Hustler Towing in Olds Alberta
 HR 52 – 1999 Kenworth W900 Century 7035 (35 Ton), sold to Peninsula Towing on Vancouver Island (current owner)
 HR 52 – 2012 Kenworth T800 Century 5230 (30 Ton), sold to Tonk's Towing in Richmond B.C, 2022 sold to Mario’s Towing in Kelowna B.C.
 HR 68 – 2007 Western Star 4900sb Century 2012 5230 (30 ton), sold to Berg's Towing in IL, sold to Val-U Auto & Towing in Owego, NY, and in July 2021 at Lil Pete's Automotive in Mahopac, NY
 HR 116 – 2015 Western Star 4900sb Century 9055 (50 Ton), sold to Reliable Towing Merritt, BC, currently in the Mission Fleet
 HR 117 – 2015 Western Star 4900sb Century 9055 with SP-850 XP side puller (50 ton), sold to Berg's Towing in Monmouth, IL, traded in to Zip's and then to A+ Towing
 HR 126 – 1999 Peterbilt 379 Vulcan V70, Wrecker body is a 2015, truck went into service in 2016 (25 ton), sold to Peninsula Towing in Vancouver Island January 2021
 HR 127 – 2019 Mack Anthem, Century 5230 (30 ton) Burned in a fire on May 16, 2022. 
 HR 85 – 1985 KW LW900 Century 1040 (bought from Ben's Towing in 2021), Currently for sell to pay for Mack's replacement, finishing HR 50, and to buy this trucks replacement
 FD-114 Freightliner tandem deck truck (sold to peninsula Towing September 2022)
Rotators

 HR 150 – 2009 Peterbilt Century 1075 (75 ton), sold to United Towing Services Inc in Canmore, AB, sold to FIFE in Washington state who painted it white, sold to Purdys towing in Oregon
 HR 150 "The Famous Rotator" – 2012 Western Star 4900sb Century 1075 (75 ton), sold to Berg's Towing in Monmouth, IL, traded in to Zip's, July 2021 Ron's Towing Lincoln, IL

misc other former trucks

 Coastline 51, sold to Logan Lake Towing
 Coastline TR 43
 FD 121 – Flatdeck, sold to Aggressive Towing of Jamie Davis' brother
 FD 124 – Robs truck that was rolled
 FD 45 - Hino flat deck
 TR 57 – Western Star, sold to van Horne towing 
 TR 58 – Western Star, sold
 HU 55 - International Incident Response Truck
 AC 103
 IR 109
 IR 118 – Toyota Tundra
 IR 104/105 – Toyota Tundra pickup truck

Quiring Towing fleet 

 Unit 90 "The Green Goblin" – 2007 Kenworth T800H with a Vulcan V100 tri-axle wrecker with side puller 
 Unit 55 "Plan B" – 2017 KW T800 X15 565/2150 with def and dpf v100 Vulcan tandem wrecker
 Unit 95 – 2009 Kenworth T300 single axle, Challenger (20 ton)
 Unit 85 – 2016 Kenworth T800 28 ft Tandem NRC 40TB Flatdeck
 Unit 50 – 2016 Kenworth T470 26 ft Jerr-Dan Flatdeck with SRS10 Side Recovery System (10 ton)
 Unit ??- 2021 Ford 22 ft Deck truck
 Unit C60 – 1973 GMC 3 TonnHolmes 500 Wrecker
 Unit 25 – 1985 GMC Service Truck
 Unit ?? - 1964 D9 Dozer
 Unit ?? - 1967 D9 Dozer

Spinoff
On October 10, 2016, the pilot for Heavy Rescue: 401, a spinoff series set in Ontario, aired on the Discovery Channel. The first season of Heavy Rescue: 401 debuted on January 3, 2017.

References

External links
 Official website: Highway Thru Hell
 Highway Thru Hell on Twitter: https://twitter.com/HWYThruHell
 Highway Thru Hell on Facebook: https://www.facebook.com/hwythruhell?ref=bookmarks
 Highway Thru Hell on Instagram: https://www.instagram.com/hwythruhell/?hl=en
 Great Pacific Television, Highway Thru Hell (production website)
 
 Jamie Davis Motor Truck & Auto Ltd: http://www.jamiedavistowing.com/
 Quiring Towing: http://www.quiringtowing.com/
 Mission Towing: http://www.missiontowing.ca/
 Aggressive Towing: http://www.aggressiveautotowing.com/
 Reliable Towing Merritt: https://www.tomsmerritttowing.ca/
 Discovery Channel Canada, Highway Thru Hell (original network website)
 The Weather Channel (USA), Highway Thru Hell
 The Weather Channel Originals on Facebook (USA), 
 National Geographic Channel, Highway Thru Hell
 National Geographic Channel (UK and Ireland), Highway Thru Hell
 After The Storm - a 2-part series from the Producers of Highway Thru Hell - on the floods affecting British Columbia in 2021: After The Storm

2010s Canadian reality television series
2012 Canadian television series debuts
2016 Canadian television series endings
Television series by Beyond Television Productions
Discovery Channel (Canada) original programming